Franzl or Fränzl is both a given name and surname. Notable people with the name include:

Ferdinand Fränzl, German violinist, composer, and conductor
Franzl Lang
Friederich Franzl, Austrian footballer
Ignaz Fränzl, German violinist and composer

German-language surnames